Maldita Nerea (English: Darn Nerea) is a Spanish pop/rock band.

History 

The group originated in Murcia. They started with small concerts in the city and then Salamanca, where Jorge moved to continue his studies of speech therapy. These concerts were successful and the band became popular.

They attracted the attention of Universal Music and in October 2003, their debut album Cuarto creciente was released. In 2007, following the first album and their departure from Universal, Jorge Ruiz decided that the next release would be self-published. Called El secreto de las tortugas, it was released on "Cuarto Creciente Producciones". In 2009 they released the album Es un secreto... No se lo digas a nadie, which featured remastered versions of previously released songs.

During 2010, the band had a hit with the song "Cosas que suenan a..." which reached number 1 on iTunes (in Spain) and was credited as iTunes Song of the Year.

In 2011, they released their album Fácil and announced a tour of Spain and an additional date in London. In that year, they recorded the song "Bienvenidos a nuestro Clan" for the TVE Clan shorts programme Clanners.

The band's 2017 single "Bailarina", from the album of the same name, was chosen as the official anthem of the 72nd edition of the Vuelta a España cycling race and was performed live at the team presentation on 17 August 2017 in Nîmes. The video for the song was also shot there.

Members 

Original members
 Jorge Ruiz – vocals and writer
 Luis Gómez – guitar
 Carlos Molina – bass
 Sergio Bernal – drums

Current members
 Jorge Ruiz – vocals and writer
 Luis A. Gómez – guitar
 Jordi Armengol – guitar
 Pedro A. Carrillo – bass
 Tato Latorre – guitar
 Serginho Moreira – drums

Discography 
 Cuarto Creciente (2003)
 El secreto de las tortugas (2007)
 Maldita Maqueta (2004)
 Es un secreto... No se lo digas a nadie (2009)
 Fácil (2011)
 Mira dentro (2014)
 Bailarina (2017)
 Un planeta llamado nosotros (2020) No. 1 Spain

Awards

40 Principales Awards 

Los Premios 40 Principales of music, are some awards created in 2006 by the radio station Los 40 Principales, to celebrate the 40th anniversary of the foundation of the station.

Lo que de Verdad Importa Awards

Cadena 100 Awards

Neox Fan Awards

References

External links 
 

Spanish musical groups
Spanish rock music groups
Spanish pop rock music groups
Rock en Español music groups
Sony Music Spain artists